Narragansett Church may refer to several churches in Rhode Island, including:
Old Narragansett Church
Narragansett Baptist Church